Woodstock is a civil parish in Carleton County, New Brunswick, Canada, surrounding the town of the same name on its landward side. It comprises one town, one Indian reserve, part of one village, and parts of three local service districts, all of which except the Indian reserve are members of the Western Valley Regional Service Commission (WVRSC)..

The Census subdivision of the same name includes all of the parish except the municipalities and Indian reserve.

Origin of name
The parish was named in honour of Viscount Woodstock, a junior title of the Duke of Portland, Prime Minister of Great Britain when the Loyalists arrived in New Brunswick.

History
Woodstock was erected in 1786 as one York County's original parishes. The parish included most of Richmond Parish and parts of Canterbury, Dumfries, McAdam, and North Lake Parishes.

Boundaries
Woodstock Parish is bounded:

 on the east by the Saint John River;
 on the north by the northern line of a grant nearly opposite the mouth of Shaws Creek and its prolongation westerly;
 on the west by the rear or western line of the second tier of lots west of the Saint John River, prolonged to the Eel River;
 and on the south and southeast by the Eel River.
 The parish also includes any islands in front of it in the Saint John River. The Territorial Division Act and cadastral map of the area are both moot on whether the northern boundary runs around or through Pine Island.

Evolution of boundaries
Woodstock's original boundaries extended along the southern bank of the Saint John River from just west of Pokiok to its modern northern line, which extended inland through what's now Richmond Parish. The parish extended inland  from the river along its length, crossing into what's now Maine.

In 1798 an international commission settled the boundary with the United States as far north as the boundary monument that marks the start of the southern boundary of Carleton County.

In 1832 Carleton County was separated from York, with the county line running through Woodstock Parish.

In 1833 the York County portion of Woodstock was included in the newly erected Dumfries Parish.

In 1834 the boundary with York County was altered to run along grant lines as it neared the Saint John River. This exchanged several small pieces of territory along the Eel River with Dumfries Parish in York County.

In 1838 all of Wakefield Parish south of the Meduxnekeag River along with any territory between Woodstock's western border and the boundary with the United States was annexed to Woodstock, putting part of Maine claimed by New Brunswick in the parish.

In 1842 the boundary with the United States was settled by the Webster–Ashburton Treaty.

In 1850 the original county line was restored, reversing the 1834 territorial exchange with Dumfries.

In 1853 all of Woodstock west of the first two tiers of grants was erected as Richmond Parish.

In 1854 the northern boundary was extended through the Meduxnekeag, transferring parts of two grants straddling the river to Wakefield Parish.

Municipalities
The town of Woodstock sits at the mouth of the Meduxnekeag River, near the northeastern corner of the parish.

The village of Meductic sits at the mouth of the Eel River, straddling the York County line.

Indian reserve
The Woodstock 23 Indian reserve stretches inland from the Saint John River, starting along Hodgdon Road and extending inland to King Road. The reserve belongs to the Woodstock First Nation, a Wəlastəkwewiyik band.

Local service districts
All LSDs assess for the basic LSD services of fire protection, police services, land use planning, emergency measures, and dog control.

Woodstock Parish
The local service district of the parish of Woodstock originally contained all of the parish except Woodstock, Meductic, and Debec. The Indian reserve is under federal administration but not explicitly excluded from the LSD. A small wetland area west of the mouth of Fish Creek in Richmond Parish was added to this LSD in 2014.

The LSD was established in 1966 to assess for fire protection following the elimination of county government under the new Municipalities Act. Community services were added in 1967 and recreational facilities in 1995.

Today Woodstock Parish assesses for the additional service of community & recreational services. The taxing authority is 218.00 Woodstock.

LSD advisory committee? Yes. Chair Brian Hayden has sat on the WVRSC board of directors since at least 2015.

Debec
Debec occupies an irregular area along the western side of the parish.

Benton
Benton straddles the county line at the bend of the Eel River, extending along the Benton, Lewin, and Caldwell Roads.

The LSD was established in 1967 to add community planning and street lights. Community services were added in 1968.

Today Benton additionally assesses for street lighting and community & recreation services. The taxing authority is 219.00 Benton.

LSDAC? Unknown.

Communities
Communities at least partly within the parish; bold indicates an incorporated municipality or Indian reserve

  Bedell Settlement
 Benton
 Bulls Creek
 Dibblee
 Hillman
 Mapledale
  Meductic
  Porten Settlement
 Riceville
  Speerville
 Springfield
 Teeds Mills
 Upper Woodstock
 Valley
  Woodstock
 Woodstock 23
 Indian Village

Bodies of water
Bodies of water at least partly in the parish:

 Eel River
 Meduxnekeag River
  Saint John River
 Bulls Creek
 Fish Creek
 Lanes Creek
 Hays Lake

Islands
Islands at least partly in the parish:
 Woodstock Island

Other notable places
Parks, historic sites, and other noteworthy places at least partly in the parish.
 Kindness Club Wildlife Refuge
 Meduxnekeag Valley Protected Natural Area

Demographics
Parish population total does not include  town of Woodstock, Woodstock 23 Indian reserve, and portion within  Meductic

Population
Population trend

Language
Mother tongue (2016)

See also
List of parishes in New Brunswick

Notes

References

Local service districts of Carleton County, New Brunswick
Parishes of Carleton County, New Brunswick